Mykhailo Koval (26 February 1956) is a Colonel General of Ukraine who until 2014 worked in the State Border Guard Service of Ukraine. During the 2014 Crimea crisis he was appointed as the Minister of Defence replacing Admiral Ihor Tenyukh who resigned.

Professional career
Having entered the Army as a Conscript in the Artillery in 1974, in 1978 Koval graduated the Kamianets-Podilsky Higher Military-Engineer Command School as a Second Lieutenant in the Sappers. Until 1987 he served in the Sapper units of the Soviet Airborne Troops (VDV), in 1987 being a Captain, after which he entered the M. V. Frunze Military Academy in Moscow and graduated it in 1990 with the rank of Lieutenant Colonel. In 1990-95 Koval served in a VDV training centre.

In 1997 he also graduated the National University of Defense of Ukraine. In 1997-99 Koval worked in commanding positions of the Northern Operation Command, in 1999–2001 - the Western Operation Command. In 2001-02 he served as the First Deputy Commander of the Internal Troops of Ukraine, since 2002 and until 2013 - the First Deputy Commander of the State Border Guard Service of Ukraine.

Awards and decorations
 Order of Merit (Ukraine)
 Medal For Military Service to Ukraine
 Defender of the Motherland Medal
 Dignity and Honour Commendation
 Order of the Red Star
 Order for Service to the Homeland in the Armed Forces of the USSR
 Medal for Battle Merit
 Jubilee Medal "70 Years of the Armed Forces of the USSR"
 Medal "For Impeccable Service" (15 years)
 Medal "For Impeccable Service" (10 years)

See also
2014 Crimean crisis

References

External links
 Unknown kidnapped a Colonel General in Crimea. Espreso. March 5, 2014
 Leadership of the State Border Guard Service of Ukraine

Colonel Generals of Ukraine
Living people
1956 births
People from Izyaslav
Defence ministers of Ukraine
People of the annexation of Crimea by the Russian Federation
Ukrainian people taken hostage
Ivan Chernyakhovsky National Defense University of Ukraine alumni
Frunze Military Academy alumni
Recipients of the Order of Merit (Ukraine), 2nd class
Recipients of the Order of Merit (Ukraine), 3rd class
Pro-Ukrainian people of the 2014 pro-Russian unrest in Ukraine
Ukrainian military personnel of the war in Donbas
Recipients of the Order of Bohdan Khmelnytsky, 3rd class